Karen Chammas is a Lebanese judoka. Chammas competed at the Singapore 2010 Youth Games and was placed 7th worldwide, Continental Championships U20, and the 2012 Olympic Games where she tied for last place as she was defeated in the first round. Chammas is the first female judoka to ever participate for Lebanon in the Olympic Games.

References

External links
 
 
 

1993 births
Living people
Lebanese female judoka
Judoka at the 2010 Summer Youth Olympics
Judoka at the 2012 Summer Olympics
Olympic judoka of Lebanon
Lebanese American University alumni
Judoka at the 2010 Asian Games
Judoka at the 2014 Asian Games
Asian Games competitors for Lebanon